Sir Roderick Brian Newton (born 15 April 1958), styled The Hon. Mr Justice Newton, is a judge of the High Court of England and Wales.

He was educated at City of London Polytechnic.

He was called to the bar at Middle Temple in 1982. He has been a judge of the High Court of Justice (Family Division) since 2014.

References

1958 births
Living people
Alumni of London Guildhall University
Members of the Middle Temple
Family Division judges
Knights Bachelor